RADA Special Deterrence Forces is a Madkhali radical Islamist special operations military police unit formed in Tripoli Libya for the purpose of tackling crime. Its focus is high-profile kidnappings, murders, drug and alcohol poisoning related deaths, illegal migrant smuggling, weapons smuggling, explosives smuggling, terrorist attacks and plots. A lack of political power and police presence in Tripoli provoked the founding of this special unit.

The leader is Abdul Raouf Kara.

Rada has been involved in tackling non-Islamic activities and dissidents within Tripoli, including fighting against Libyan National Army.

History
RADA was originally a fighting unit that helped topple Muammar Gaddafi in the 17 February 2011 Civil War. After Gaddafi, Abdul Rauf Kara was a member of the police force formed by the Supreme Security Committee with a reported 700 men at his disposal. The Supreme Security Committee (SSC) was then dissolved into the Ministry of Internal Affairs of Libya where his forces were then relabeled as RADA Special Deterrence forces under the guidance of the Ministry of Interior.

Size and composition

The group has an estimated 1500 members. It is the third or fourth largest militia in Tripoli. 90% of their force are legitimate police officers, 70% of whom served in the Libyan police force prior to 2011. Their main areas of operations in Tripoli are the western areas of Soug Al Jouma and Ain Zara. Their headquarters are at Mitiga International Airport.

Operations 

RADA operates as an independent department under the Ministry of Interior, and implements a focused anti-narcotics and police force mandate. RADA Special Forces are involved in police work, investigations, arrests, patrols, checkpoints, and other anti-crime activities. This organisation actively and publicly releases images and online footage displaying the seizure of explosives and components smuggled by terrorists, unregulated alcohol seizures, unregulated medical goods such as Tramadol, dollar-dinar black market arrests, arrests of terrorism and terrorist suspects, arrests of kidnappers and other criminals, seizing illegal contraband, etc.

RADA operates primarily within Tripoli, but also outside the capital, in cities such as Sabratha, Zawiah, Benghazi, Sirte, Dernah and Zwarah.

RADA operates under Islamic Sharia principles with "accordance to" post Gaddafi era Laws reformed under controversial circumstances by the Islamic Supreme court of Tripoli. Legal and political reforms were made during the Coup d'état against House of representatives in the battle of Tripoli of 2013-14 by "Libya Dawn".

As an example, in August 2017, one of Libya's most notorious human and fuel smugglers Fahmi Salim Bin Khalifa was captured as ordered by the Attorney General's Office and praised by the state owned National Oil Corporation. The move is notable due to Libya's 2013 – 2017 security vacuum and governance crisis.

Controversy

Raid on Comiccon Libya 
On 3 November 2017, RADA and the Nawasi Brigade in charge of security shut down the officially registered 'Comiccon Libya' event, which hosted around 2000 – 3000 people. The event was raided by RADA in the Data El Emad office complex area.
 
The organizers of Comiccon allegedly hosted "satanic, pornographic, and masonic material that intended to corrupt the morals of the youth and the Libyan people, influenced by western culture". The alarm was raised when Facebook groups mistakenly labeled the Comiccon as a Halloween event, implying that the event was hosting pagan material. Commiccon was sponsored by the 'SIGMA' group, and hosted Comics from Marvel and other related material (Otaku) from anime and manga comics. Foam board images of Catwoman, Wonderwoman, and Hulk were torn down, Disney action figures were broken as they "represented false idols" that were deemed haram by hardline Islamists. The Al Nawasi brigade in charge of security demanded the immediate removal of Japanese art and language writing as some resembled Christian crosses. A Korean-Japanese booth selling Japanese kimono was closed and accused of spreading Buddhism. The organizers of Comiccon faced "legal prosecution" for "violating public morals".

References

Law enforcement units
Law enforcement in Libya
Non-military counterterrorist organizations
Organizations established in 2011
2011 establishments in Libya